The Interstate Eight Conference (Interstate 8 or I–8) is an athletic conference of Illinois high schools that are members of the Illinois High School Association (IHSA). The conference currently has eight member schools that compete in 12 different sports (boys' basketball, girls' basketball, girls' volleyball, boys' golf, girls' golf, football, boys' soccer, girls' soccer, wrestling, baseball, softball, cross country, and track and field).

The Interstate Eight began in 1979 and originally had eight schools—Coal City, Dwight, Marseilles, Plano, Reed Custer,  Seneca, Wilmington, and Yorkville. Sandwich soon entered the I-8 when Marseilles dropped out. In 1991, Yorkville was replaced by Lisle. In 2006 Herscher, Manteno, Peotone, and Westmont joined the conference.  Despite the conference growing from eight to 12 teams, the conference name remained Interstate 8. Dwight left the conference prior to the 2014–15 season while Streator joined the conference. In 2019-20, Reed-Custer, Manteno, Peotone, Herscher, Wilmington, Seneca, Streator, Coal City, Westmont and Lisle left the conference leaving only Plano and Sandwich in the conference. That year, the conference added six former Northern Illinois Big 12 Conference, Kaneland, LaSalle-Peru, Morris, Ottawa, Rochelle, and Sycamore. These moves left Plano as the only remaining founding member of the conference.

In 2022, Sandwich High School and Plano High School announcing to leave the conference to join Kishwaukee River Conference starting in 2023-24 season. Plano was the final remaining original I8C member, completing nearly 45 seasons. 

Most of the member schools are/were in rural/smaller towns. Former members Westmont and Lisle are suburbs of Chicago but enrollments are small in size. Westmont's population is divided between the varying schools in the area, including high schools in Darien, Woodridge, Hinsdale, Bolingbrook, Naperville, Lisle, Lombard, and Glen Ellyn. Lisle's enrollment is small, due to Lisle's relatively small size as a city, as well as being located east of Naperville, which has at least four high schools in the immediate vicinity, as well as the Glenbard schools and Wheaton-Warrenville South all being within a close proximity to the high school.

The Conference is divided into Large and Small divisions during football season and teams only play members of their division for the conference schedule. Baseball and softball are also divided into North and South divisions. In all other sports, the conference is undivided.

Members
There are eight current members of the conference

Membership Timeline

State titles

Football
Football is based on an 8 class system since 2001.

Plano (2006 3A, 2007 3A)
Coal City (1993 2A)
Seneca (1990 2A)
Wilmington (2014 3A)

Boys baseball
Lisle (2013 2A)
 Wilmington (2003, 2005)
Reed-Custer (1985) (2016)
Herscher (1999) (2015)

Wrestling
Wilmington (2007, 2008, 2009)
Sandwich (1991, 1997, 1999, 2001)
Reed-Custer (2010,2012)

Boys basketball
Seneca (2005–06 A)

Boys golf
Dwight (1980)

Boys soccer
Lisle (2010 1A)

Girls soccer
Manteno (2009 1A)
Manteno (2014 1A)

Competitive cheerleading
Dwight (2013)
Wilmington(2016)

Competitive Dance Team
Peotone (2012 1A)

Boys cross country
Cross Country is based on a 3 class system since 2007.
Seneca (1989 A)
Kaneland (2019 AA)

Girls cross country
Cross Country is based on a 3 class system since 2007.
Herscher (1991 A, 1992 A, 1996 A)

Girls track and field
Herscher (1996)

Girls softball
Coal City (2010)

Girls volleyball
Lisle (1985)

Scholastic Bowl
Lisle (2011, 2012, 2013, 2014, 2015, 2016 wins)

References

External links 
 Interstate 8 Conference

High school sports conferences and leagues in the United States
Illinois high school sports conferences
High school sports in Illinois